M. F. Cummings & Son was an architectural firm from Troy, New York, founded upon the 1891 retirement of architect Marcus F. Cummings. He left the office in the hands of his son, Frederic M. Cummings, and only kept a financial interest. Cummings retired to Martha's Vineyard. The office lasted into the 1930s.

Cummings & Son was responsible for many important buildings in Troy and the surrounding region, including the campus of the Troy Female Seminary, the Rensselaer County Courthouse, and many public and private schools.

Architectural works
 1891 - Gurley Memorial Hall, Troy Female Seminary, Troy, New York
 1893 - Anna M. Plum Memorial Hall, Troy Female Seminary, Troy, New York
 1895 - Mohawk and Hudson River Humane Society Building, 77 4th St, Troy, New York
 1895 - Russell Sage Hall, Troy Female Seminary, Troy, New York
 1896 - Rensselaer County Courthouse, 80 2nd St, Troy, New York
 1898 - Public School No. 10, 77 Adams St, Troy, New York
 1898 - St. Mary's R. C. Church, 196 3rd St, Troy, New York
 1899 - St. Augustine R. C. School, 525 4th Ave, Lansingburgh, New York
 1902 - Hotel Allen, 26 Main St, Fair Haven, Vermont
 Demolished.
 1903 - National State Bank Building, 297 River St, Troy, New York
 1904 - Ilium Building, 406 Fulton St, Troy, New York
 1905 - Alanson J. Baker House, 307 S William St, Johnstown, New York
 1908 - Troy Waste Manufacturing Company Building, 444 River St, Troy, New York
 1908 - Emma Willard School, 285 Pawling Ave, Troy, New York
 1909 - Public School No. 1, 2920 5th Ave, Troy, New York
 1915 - First Presbyterian Church, 61 3rd St, Waterford, New York
 1916 - St. Agnes R. C. School, 45 Johnston Ave, Cohoes, New York
 1917 - St. Francis R. C. Academy, 311 Congress St, Troy, New York
 1921 - Public School No. 14 (Former), 15th St, Troy, New York
 Now owned by the Rensselaer Polytechnic Institute.
 1922 - Williams Memorial School, 71 N 3rd St, Hudson, New York
 1935 - Union National Bank Building, 50 4th St, Troy, New York

References

Architecture firms based in New York (state)
Design companies established in 1891
1891 establishments in New York (state)
1930s disestablishments in New York (state)